North of Arizona is a 1935 American Western film directed by Harry S. Webb and starring Jack Perrin, Blanche Mehaffey and Lane Chandler. It was a low-budget B film made by Reliable Pictures.

Main cast
 Jack Perrin as Jack Loomis  
 Blanche Mehaffey as Madge Herron  
 Lane Chandler as Ray Keeler  
 Al Bridge as George Tully  
 Murdock MacQuarrie as Elmer Herron  
 George Chesebro as Dick  
 Artie Ortego as Red Cloud  
 Budd Buster as Grey Wolf

References

Bibliography
 Pitts, Michael R. Poverty Row Studios, 1929–1940: An Illustrated History of 55 Independent Film Companies, with a Filmography for Each. McFarland & Company, 2005.

External links
 

1935 films
1935 Western (genre) films
1930s English-language films
American Western (genre) films
Films directed by Harry S. Webb
Reliable Pictures films
American black-and-white films
1930s American films